Kandikuppa is situated in East Godavari district in Katrenikona, in Andhra Pradesh State, India.

References

Villages in East Godavari district